Eurysphindus comatulus is a species of cryptic slime mold beetle in the family Sphindidae. It is found in North America.

References

Further reading

 
 

Sphindidae
Articles created by Qbugbot
Beetles described in 1993